Henry Torrens may refer to:
Henry Torrens (British Army officer) (1779–1828), Adjutant-General to the Forces
Henry Torrens (1823–1889), British army officer and colonial governor
Henry Whitelock Torrens (1806–1852), British essayist

See also
Henry Torrens Anstruther (1860–1926), British politician